The 1997–98 Ranji Trophy was the 64th season of the Ranji Trophy cricket championship. Karnataka won the final match against Uttar Pradesh on first innings lead.

Super League
Group A

  Karnataka and Mumbai qualified for the Knockout Stage. 
 Karnataka received a bye to the semifinals as the group winner. 
 Mumbai received a bye to the semifinals as the defending champions.

Group B

  Uttar Pradesh and Bengal qualified for the Knockout Stage. 
 Delhi and Tamil Nadu were suspended from the tournament on February 21, 1998. Points against them were not considered for the remaining teams.

Group C

  Hyderabad and Haryana qualified for the Knockout Stage.

Knockout stage

Quarterfinal 1

Quarterfinal 2

Semifinal 1

Semifinal 2

Final

Scorecards and averages
Cricketarchive

References

External links
 Ranji Trophy, 1997-98 at ESPN Cricinfo
 Tournament home at ESPN Cricinfo archives
 

1998 in Indian cricket
Ranji Trophy seasons
Domestic cricket competitions in 1997–98